Anthrenocerus arrowi is a species of beetle, native to Australia.  It is within the Anthrenocerus genus, and the family Dermestidae

References

Dermestidae
Beetles described in 1949